Arnette is both a given name and surname. Notable people with the name include:

Arnette Lamb (1947–1998), American writer
Damon Arnette (born 1996), American football player
Jay Arnette (born 1938), American basketball player
Jeannetta Arnette (born 1954), American actress

See also
Arnett (name)